Paul Sahlin (born Paul Johansson; 30 March 1955), known by his stage name Paul Paljett, is a Swedish singer, songwriter and musician. Later he became a funeral director. He is well known for songs like the 1977 Svensktoppen hit Guenerina., Flyg min fjäril flyg and the Christmas song Jag önskar er alla en riktigt god jul. He also was the singer in Matz Bladhs between 1991 and 2004. Earlier, he had been the singer in the band Säwes. Later, he became active with his dansband Paul Sahlins.

Discography 

 Två sidor (1976)
 Mumbo Jumbo (1977)
 At Your Service (1978)

Svensktoppen songs
1975-1976 - Oh Baby
1976 - C'est la vie
1976 - Tom och Helen
1977 - Guenerina
1977 - Ingen vind, ingen våg
1978 - Jag vill ge dig ett äventyr
1978 - Misslyckade mig
1980 - Tusen sekunder
1987 - Golden Gate
1987 - Ung och evig (duet with Anne Kihlström)
1987 - Luffarpojken (with Säwes)
1991 - Andante, Andante

Citations

External links 

 

1955 births
20th-century Swedish male musicians
20th-century Swedish male singers
21st-century Swedish male singers
Swedish male singer-songwriters
Swedish multi-instrumentalists
Living people
Melodifestivalen contestants of 1987